Adipudi Somanatharao (1867—1941) was an Indian writer and social reformer.

Biography
Adipudi Somanatharao belonged to the Brahmin community of Sandilya Gotra. He worked in Pithapuram, Sansthanam as a scholar. He was a well-known poet in Sanskrit, Kannada, Hindi, Tamil and Telugu. He introduced the style of Ravindranath Tagore poetry to the Telugu people.

Translator 
He translated the Kamba Ramayanam from Tamil to Telugu. He established the "Srikrishnadevarayandhra Bhashanilayam" with the help of the famous scholar, "Komarraju Lakshmanarao". He translated the famous epic in English "Paradise and the Peri" which was written by Thomas Moore (1779-1852) into Telugu.

Writings
 Japan Desa Charitra (History of Japan)
 Dayananda Saraswathi Charitra (Biography of Dayananda Sasarwathi)
 Satyartha Prakasika
 Andhra Raghuvamsam
 Andhra Kumara Sambhavamu
 Vijayendra Vijayamu
 Srikrishnadevaraya Charitra
 Kenopashattu
 Kamba Ramayanam
 Geetanjali
 Geethamrutasaramu
 Kinnari Vijayam (1920)
 Budha Bhushanam
 Sarvamanya Satakam
 Lokapavana Satakam
 Ramamohana Natakam.

Kinnari Vijayam 
Kinnari Vijayam is perhaps Somantharao's most famous poem. It was published at Kakinada in 1920.

References

External links
 Somanatharao, Adipudi, 20th Century Telugu velugulu, second part, Telugu University, Hyderabad, 2005, page: 1023.

1867 births
1941 deaths
Telugu writers
Indian social reformers
English–Telugu translators
Tamil–Telugu translators